Gregory Eugene Mullins is a former Major League Baseball pitcher. Mullins was signed by the Milwaukee Brewers as a free agent in 1995. He played with the team at the Major League level in 1998.

Mullins played at the collegiate level at St. John's River State College and the University of North Florida.

References

People from Seminole County, Florida
Milwaukee Brewers players
Major League Baseball pitchers
North Florida Ospreys baseball players
1971 births
Living people
Baseball players from Florida
Baseball players from Columbus, Ohio
Beloit Snappers players
El Paso Diablos players
Helena Brewers players
Louisville Redbirds players
Stockton Ports players